Francisco de la Dehesa was a Spanish sculptor in the 17th century.

References

Spanish sculptors
Spanish male sculptors
17th-century Spanish people